Placolepis is an extinct genus of phyllolepid placoderm first discovered in New South Wales. Placolepis was the most widespread phyllolepid genus, with fossils found in Australia, Turkey, Venezuela and Antarctica.

References

Phyllolepids
Placoderms of Europe
Placoderms of Australia
Placoderms of North America
Placoderms of Antarctica